Rectoris is a genus of cyprinid fish found in China and Vietnam.

Species
There are currently five recognized species in this genus:
 Rectoris longibarbus D. G. Zhu & J. H. Lan, 2012
 Rectoris longifinus W. X. Li, W. N. Mao & Zong-Min Lu, 2002
 Rectoris luxiensis H. W. Wu & Yao, 1977
 Rectoris mutabilis (S. Y. Lin, 1933)
 Rectoris posehensis S. Y. Lin, 1935

References

Cyprinid fish of Asia
Cyprinidae genera
Labeoninae